TDOR may refer to:

 Test Drive Off-Road, a video racing game
 Transgender Day of Remembrance, a day designated for the memory of transgender hate crime victims
 Tennessee Department of Revenue